White Center is a census-designated place (CDP) in King County, Washington, United States. It lies between West Seattle and Burien. The population was 16,631 at the 2020 census.

White Center is sometimes referred to by the nickname "Rat City" due to the historical presence of a military Relocation and Training Center during World War II. The Rat City Rollergirls are a Seattle roller derby team that began training in White Center.

Geography
White Center is located in western King County at  (47.507370, −122.347385).

The CDP is bordered to the north and west by Seattle, to the east by unincorporated Boulevard Park, and to the south by the city of Burien. Washington State Route 509 forms the eastern border of the White Center CDP.

Demographics

As of the census of 2010, there were 13,495 people, 4,920 households, and 3,105 families residing in the CDP. The population density was 5,996.0 people per square mile (2,315.1/km2). There were 5,235 housing units at an average density of 2,326.0/sq mi (898.1/km2). The racial makeup of the CDP was 47.0% White (39.6% Non-Hispanic White), 9.0% Black or African American, 1.6% American Indian and Alaska Native, 22.9% Asian, 1.7% Native Hawaiian and Other Pacific Islander, 11.4% from other races, and 6.4% from two or more races. Hispanic or Latino people of any race were 21.5% of the population.

There were 4,920 households, out of which 35.0% had individuals under 18 years, 39.2% were husband-wife families, 16.7% had a female householder with no husband present, and 36.9% were non-families. 26.7% of all households were made up of individuals, and 6.5% had someone living alone who was 65 years of age or older. The average household size was 2.73 and the average family size was 3.29.

In terms of age distribution, 23.7% were under the age of 18, 67.3% from 18 to 64, and 9.0% were 65 years of age or older. The median age was 36.1 years. For every 100 females there were 102.6 males. For every 100 females age 18 and over, there were 102.0 males.

The median income for a household in the CDP was $35,448, and the median income for a family was $41,433. Males who worked full-time, year-round had a median income of $32,392 versus $28,893 for females. The per capita income for the CDP was $19,852. About 23.8% of families and 25.0% of the population were below the poverty line, including 38.3% of those under age 18 and 10.5% of those age 65 or over. The typical home for sale in White Center was built in 1969, which is older than the typical home for sale in Washington.

Education

White Center is part of the Highline School District, which covers much of southwestern King County. Elementary schools include Beverly Park Elementary, Mount View Elementary, Southern Heights Elementary, and White Center Heights Elementary. Secondary schools include Rainier Prep Public Charter School, Cascade Middle School, New Start High School, and Evergreen High School.

History

Incorporation
White Center is one of only two heavily urbanized areas in King County that is not incorporated as part of a city (the other being Bryn Mawr-Skyway). Seattle has been working towards incorporating the area since the mid-2000s. An area south of White Center, known as North Highline, was annexed by neighboring Burien on April 1, 2010. The Seattle city council rejected annexation of White Center in 2009, and a measure to annex White Center to Burien was rejected by voters in 2012.

Plans to annex White Center got a boost in March 2016 when the state legislature directed that $7 million go to the city of Seattle if it annexes the area. Completing annexation would require approval by the voters in the area as well as by the Seattle City Council, and would not be completed before 2017.

Notable people

 Richard Hugo, poet
 Floyd Johnson, boxer
 Jack Thompson, football player

References

External links

 White Center Community Development Association

Census-designated places in King County, Washington